Salinimicrobium terrae is a Gram-negative, obligately aerobic, non-spore-forming, slightly halophilic and non-motile bacterium from the genus of Salinimicrobium which has been isolated from saline soil from the Qaidam Basin in China.

References

Flavobacteria
Bacteria described in 2008